Pirate Parties International (PPI) is an international non-profit and non-governmental organization with headquarters in Brussels, Belgium. Formed in 2010, it serves as a worldwide organization  for Pirate Parties, currently representing 39 members from 36 countries across Europe, Americas, Asia, Africa and Australasia. The Pirate Parties are political incarnations of the freedom of expression movement, trying to achieve their goals by the means of the established political system rather than just through activism. In 2017 PPI had been granted special consultative status to the United Nations Economic and Social Council.

Aims

The PPI statutes give its purposes as:to help establish, to support and promote, and to maintain communication and co-operation between pirate parties around the world.The PPI advocate on the international level for the promotion of the goals its Members share such as protection of human rights and fundamental freedoms in the digital age, consumer and authors rights-oriented reform of copyright and related rights, support of information privacy, transparency, and free access to information.

The name "Pirates" itself is a reappropriation of the title that was given to internet users by the representatives of the music and film industry and does not refer to any illegal activity.

History 
The first Pirate Party was the Swedish Piratpartiet, founded on 1 January 2006.
Other parties and groups were formed in Austria, Canada, Denmark, Finland, Germany, Ireland, the Netherlands, Poland, and Spain.  In 2007, representatives of these parties met in Vienna, Austria to form an alliance and plan for the 2009 European Parliament elections.  Further conferences were held in 2008 in Berlin and Uppsala, the latter leading to the "Uppsala Declaration" of a basic platform for the elections.

In 2009, the original Pirate Party won 7.1% of the vote
in Sweden's European Parliament elections and won two of Sweden's twenty MEP seats, inspired by a surge in membership following the trial and conviction of three members of the ideologically aligned Pirate Bay a year earlier.

On 18 April 2010, the Pirate Parties International was formally founded in Brussels at the PPI Conference from April 16 to 18.

Uppsala Declaration 
At the 2009 conference of Pirate Parties International in Uppsala (Sweden), European Pirate parties agreed on a common declaration of the parties' goals for the upcoming election of the European Parliament.
Central issues of the declaration are:

 reform of copyright, exemption of non-commercial activity from copyright regulation, reduction of the duration of copyright protections; banning of DRM technologies, opposition to media or hardware levies;
 reform of patent law, particularly stating that patents on life (including patents on seeds and genes) and software should not be allowed;
 strengthening civil rights, transparent government, speedy and fair trial, freedom of speech, and expansion of the right to anonymity in communication.

Prague Declaration 
At the conference of Pirate Parties International in Prague (Czech Republic) in 2012, European Pirate parties agreed to run in the elections to the European Parliament in the year 2014 with a common program as well as establish a European political party (European Pirate Party, PPEU). The declaration has been followed by conferences in Potsdam and Barcelona to work on the structure of the legal body to come and the statutes for it.

Member Parties
As of July 2 2022, PPI has the following 31 Ordinary members with the voting power of 28 (parties sharing territory split the vote among themselves):

  Pirate Party of Austria
  Pirate Party of Belgium 
  Pirate Party of Brazil 
  Pirate Party of Catalonia
  Pirate Party of Chile 
  Czech Pirate Party 
  Estonian Pirate Party
  Pirate Party of France 
  Pirate Party Germany 
  Pirate Party of Greece 
  Pirate Party of Hungary 
  Pirate Party of Israel 
  Italian Pirate Party 
  Pirate Party Luxembourg 
  Pirate Party of Netherlands 
  Pirate Party of New Zealand (1/2 vote; vote shared with IP New Zealand)
  Internet Party New Zealand (1/2 vote; vote shared with PP New Zealand)
  Pirate Party of Norway 
  Polish Pirate Party 
  Portuguese Pirate Party
  Pirate Party of Russia 
  Pirate Party of Serbia
  Pirate Party of Slovakia (1/2 vote; vote shared with the other Slovakia)
  Pirate Party - Slovakia (1/2 vote; vote shared with the other Slovakia)
  Pirate Party Switzerland 
  Pirate Party of Tunisia 
  Pirate Party of Turkey (1/2 vote; vote shared with the other Turkey)
  Pirate Party Turkey (1/2 vote; vote shared with the other Turkey)
  Ukrainian Pirate Community
  United States Pirate Party
  Pirate Party of Venezuela

Resignations 
In February 2015, Pirate Party Australia resigned from PPI due to serious disagreement with the direction and management of the organization. In the same month, Pirate Party UK also resigned and in March the Belgian Pirate Party suspended its membership within PPI.

On 20 April 2015, the Pirate Party of Iceland voted overwhelmingly to leave PPI. A member of the executive, Arnaldur Sigurðarson, reported a 96.56% vote in favor of leaving, adding: “PPI has been pretty much useless when it comes to its objectives which should be to encourage international cooperation between Pirate Parties.”

In May 2015, the Pirate Party of Sweden resolved with a significant majority to leave PPI, canceling their observer status.

In July 2016, the Pirate Party of Canada officially withdrew from Pirate Parties International citing ongoing troubles with the organization as well as a failure to adequately provide any accomplishments over its history.

Structure 
The PPI is governed by a board, formerly led by two co-chairs, and since the Warsaw conference of 2015 by a chair and a vice-chair. Policy, governance, and applications for membership are the responsibility of the PPI General Assembly which must convene at least once per year. By the current rules, board members are elected for a two-year term, half of the board being elected every year. Since the 2019 General Assembly, the Board has 9 members (previously 7). General Secretary and Treasurer positions are filled by the board by its members.

All board meetings are recorded and the minutes are published here: https://wiki.pp-international.net/wiki/index.php?title=PPI_Board/Board_Meetings.

PPI Conferences

Pirate Party movement worldwide

References

External links 

 Wiki

 
Political internationals
Civil liberties advocacy groups
Civil rights organizations
Computer law organizations
Digital rights organizations
Freedom of expression organizations
Freedom of speech
Intellectual property activism
Intellectual property organizations
Internet privacy organizations
Internet-related activism
Organisations based in Brussels
Organizations established in 2010
Privacy organizations